Labordeta is a Spanish surname. Notable people with the surname include:

Ángela Labordeta (born 1967), Spanish writer and journalist
José Antonio Labordeta (1935–2010), Spanish singer-songwriter and politician
Miguel Labordeta (1921–1969), Spanish poet

Spanish-language surnames